A  (plural ) was the Latin term for a hut or hovel and was later (from the time of Hadrian) used typically to mean a town that emerged as a civilian settlement in the vicinity of a Roman legionary fortress.

Permanent forts attracted military dependants and civilian contractors who serviced the base and needed housing;  
Many of these communities became towns through synoecism with other communities, some in use today.

Some Canabae of Legionary Fortresses:
 Canabae of Deva Victrix, later Chester, England
 Canabae of Isca Silurium, later Caerleon, Wales
 Canabae of Novae, Bulgaria
 Canabae of Vindobona, later Vienna
 Canabae of Argentoratum, later Strasbourg
 Canabae of Nijmegen, Netherlands
 Canabae of Apulum, an ancient Dacian town, later a Roman municipium
 Canabae of Troesmis, Romania

References

Ancient Roman city planning